Charles Robert Haly (11 April 1816 – 26 August 1892) was a pastoralist and politician in Queensland, Australia. He was a Member of the Queensland Legislative Assembly.

Pastoralist 
Haly and his brother William O'Grady Haly arrived in Australia from Newfoundland in 1838 and settled on the Hunter River before moving to the Gwydir River. From there they assembled a team of men and some 5,000 sheep and travelled north through the Logan district during the early 1840s in search of land. Shearing records indicate the Haly brothers had settled Taabinga station by 1846, at which time it was an established sheep property covering 305 square miles. Despite their early occupation of the land, the Haly brothers did not apply for a lease over Taabinga until June 1850, which was granted on 10 February 1852 for a term of 14 years. By 1853, Charles Haly was at Tamrookum in the Logan district, where he married Rosa Harpur and was to remain until at least 1854. During this time it is most likely that either William Haly or a superintendent was managing Taabinga station. When his brother William returned to England in 1859, Charles became sole lessee of Taabinga. In 1863 he acquired a freehold over 314 acres of the run and remained at the property until 1875 when he moved to Dalby.

Politics

Charles Haly was elected to the Queensland Legislative Assembly in Burnett at the inaugural 1860 colonial election on 4 May 1860. He held the seat until the 1863 election on 24 June.

On the 19 June 1861 C. R. Haly, Esq., M.P., was a witness at the Select Committee on the Native Police Force, at which he supported the work of the Native Police.

On 15 April 1865, John Edwards, the member for Burnett, resigned. Charles Haly won the resulting by-election on 13 May 1865. He held the seat until 6 April 1867.

On 6 April 1869, Robert Mackenzie, former Premier and member for Burnett, retired from politics and departed for Europe. Charles Haly won the resulting by-election on 21 April 1869. Haley held the seat until he resigned on 23 March 1871. John Bramston won the resulting by-election on 3 April 1871.

On 8 December 1875, Edmund Royds, member for Leichhardt, resigned. Charles Haly won the resulting by-election on 12 January 1876. He held the seat until 14 November 1878 (the 1878 election).

Later life 
Haly died in 1892 and was buried in Dalby Monumental Cemetery.

Legacy 
Haly's Taabinga Homestead was listed on the Queensland Heritage Register in 1992.

Haly Creek (the watercourse) and Haly Creek (the locality) are both named in Haly's honour.

See also
 Members of the Queensland Legislative Assembly, 1860–1863; 1863-1867; 1868-1870; 1870-1871; 1873-1878

References

Attribution 
 This Wikipedia article contains material from "The Queensland heritage register" published by the State of Queensland under CC-BY 3.0 AU license (accessed on 7 July 2014, archived on 8 October 2014). The geo-coordinates were originally computed from the "Queensland heritage register boundaries" published by the State of Queensland under CC-BY 3.0 AU license (accessed on 5 September 2014, archived on 15 October 2014).

Further reading
  — contains a section on Charles Haly

External links 

Members of the Queensland Legislative Assembly
1816 births
1892 deaths
19th-century Australian politicians
Australian pastoralists
Pre-Separation Queensland
19th-century Australian businesspeople